Kattarp is a locality situated in Helsingborg Municipality, Skåne County, Sweden with a population of 688 inhabitants in 2010.

References 

Populated places in Helsingborg Municipality
Populated places in Skåne County